The Journal d'Analyse Mathématique is a triannual peer-reviewed scientific journal published by Magnes Press (Hebrew University of Jerusalem). It was established in 1951 by Binyamin Amirà. It covers research in mathematics, especially classical analysis and related areas such as complex function theory, ergodic theory, functional analysis, harmonic analysis, partial differential equations, and quasiconformal mapping.

Abstracting and indexing 
The journal is abstracted and indexed in:
MathSciNet
Science Citation Index Expanded
Scopus 
ZbMATH Open
According to the Journal Citation Reports, the journal has a 2021 impact factor of 1.132.

References

External links

Mathematics journals
Publications established in 1951
Multilingual journals
Triannual journals
Hebrew University of Jerusalem